Joshua Pim defeated Harold Mahony 9–7, 6–3, 6–0 in the All Comers' Final, and then defeated the reigning champion Wilfred Baddeley 3–6, 6–1, 6–3, 6–2 in the challenge round to win the gentlemen's singles tennis title at the 1893 Wimbledon Championships.

Draw

Challenge round

All comers' finals

Top half

Bottom half

References

External links

Gentlemen's Singles
Wimbledon Championship by year – Men's singles